The 2020 United States presidential election in Hawaii was held on Tuesday, November 3, 2020, as part of the 2020 United States presidential election in which all 50 states plus the District of Columbia participated. Hawaii voters chose electors to represent them in the Electoral College via a popular vote, pitting the Republican Party's nominee, incumbent President Donald Trump, and running mate Vice President Mike Pence against Democratic Party nominee, former Vice President Joe Biden, and his running mate California Senator Kamala Harris. Hawaii has four electoral votes in the Electoral College.

Hawaii was the first state in the 2020 election cycle to exceed the voter turnout in 2016, causing the state to attract attention as a representation of an overall trend in increased early voting during the general election.

Biden won Hawaii with 63.7% of the vote and a 29.5% margin over Trump, who earned 34.3%. Both major parties improved over 2016, when third parties earned nearly 8% of the vote; Biden's percentage of the vote was slightly higher than Hillary Clinton's 62.9%, while Trump improved over his 30.3% share of the 2016 vote. However, Biden's margin of victory was smaller than Clinton's 32.5%. Hawaii was one of only seven states and the District of Columbia where Trump's margin increased from 2016, and its 2.7% shift was the largest. Trump won more precincts than he did in 2016, winning more of the west coast of Oahu than he did before and every single vote on Niihau. Trump won more votes in Hawaii than any Republican in history (but not a larger percentage), narrowly beating George W. Bush's performance in 2004. Despite this modest pro-Trump margin swing, Biden received more votes than Clinton, as was the case for the six other states (California, Nevada, Utah, Arkansas, Florida, and Illinois) and the District of Columbia that he won. 

Hawaii was one of three states where Biden won every county, the other two being Massachusetts and Rhode Island. It was the eighth consecutive election that the Democratic nominee carried every county in the state. Despite his overwhelming victory here, this was the first election since 2004 in which Hawaii was not the most Democratic state in terms of margin or percentage; that title went to Vermont instead, with Massachusetts and Maryland also being ahead of Hawaii.

Per exit polls by the Associated Press, Biden had support in Hawaii across different ethnic groups, with 63% of whites and 66% of Asians voting for him. Japanese Americans make up a large percentage of the Hawaiian population, and they are among the most Democratic constituencies. Hawaii was the only state in which the electorate was majority-minority in 2020, with whites comprising only 29% of the electorate.

Primary elections

Canceled Republican primary

On December 11, 2019, the Hawaii Republican Party became one of several state GOP parties to officially cancel their respective primaries and caucuses. Donald Trump's re-election campaign and GOP officials have cited the fact that Republicans canceled several state primaries when George H. W. Bush and George W. Bush sought a second term in 1992 and 2004, respectively; and Democrats scrapped some of their primaries when Bill Clinton and Barack Obama were seeking re-election in 1996 and 2012, respectively. Because this was the first of the cancelled Republican state races to directly bind its delegates to the national convention (as opposed to a walking subcaucus-type system), Trump automatically was awarded his first 19 pledged delegates of the nomination campaign.

Democratic primary

The Hawaii Democratic primary was originally scheduled for April 4, 2020. On March 20, due to concerns over the COVID-19 pandemic, the Hawaii Democratic Party canceled in-person voting in favor of mail-in voting. The deadline was then extended to May 22.

Green primary

General election

Final predictions

Polling

Graphical summary

Aggregate polls

Polls

Results

By county

By congressional district 
Biden won both congressional districts in the state.

Electors
The Democratic Party of Hawaii selected the following individuals to cast Electoral College votes for Biden:
 John Bickel, a government and history teacher from Oahu
 Mike Golojuch Sr. - an Air Force veteran and long-time Democratic activist from Oahu
 Hermina “Mina” Morita - a retired state lawmaker from Kaua'i
 Kainoa Kaumeheiwa-Rego - a community advocate for the Office of Hawaiian Affairs from Oahu

See also
 United States presidential elections in Hawaii
 2020 Hawaii elections
 2020 United States presidential election
 2020 Democratic Party presidential primaries
 2020 Green Party presidential primaries
 2020 Republican Party presidential primaries
 2020 United States elections

Notes

References

Further reading

External links
 
 
  (state affiliate of the U.S. League of Women Voters)
 

Hawaii
2020
Presidential